Cascade Falls is a waterfall on the Kettle River in the Boundary Country of the Southern Interior of British Columbia. They are located just south of Christina Lake and just north of the Canada–United States border in a gorge 200-300 yards long and just below the railway bridge over the Kettle by the southern mainline of the Canadian Pacific Railway.  The ghost town of Cascade City aka Cascade is nearby and was named for the falls, even though they were not officially named until 1977.

References

Boundary Country
Waterfalls of British Columbia
Canyons and gorges of British Columbia
Similkameen Division Yale Land District